1955–56 Hong Kong Senior Challenge Shield was the 11th edition of Hong Kong Senior Challenge Shield after World War II.

Final

References

Senior Challenge Shield
Hong
Hong Kong Challenge Shield